La Herencia is a 1964 Argentine film. The film was screened at the International Critics' Week of the 1964 Cannes Film Festival.

Selected cast 

 Juan Verdaguer
 Nathán Pinzón
 Ernesto Bianco
 Alberto Olmedo
 Silvio Soldán
 Marisa Grieben

References

External links
 

1964 films
Argentine black-and-white films
Films based on works by Guy de Maupassant
1960s Spanish-language films
1960s Argentine films